In applied mathematics, the sliding discrete Fourier transform is a recursive algorithm to compute successive STFTs of input data frames that are a single sample apart (hopsize − 1). The calculation for the sliding DFT is closely related to Goertzel algorithm.

Definition 
Assuming that the hopsize between two consecutive DFTs is 1 sample, then

From this definition above, the DFT can be computed recursively thereafter. However, implementing the window function on a sliding DFT is difficult due to its recursive nature, therefore it is done exclusively in a frequency domain.

Sliding windowed infinite Fourier transform 
It is not possible to implement asymmetric window functions into sliding DFT.

References

FFT algorithms